Hoseason Island is an island  long and  wide, lying  west of Trinity Island in the Palmer Archipelago, Antarctica. This name, which has appeared on charts for over 100 years, commemorates James Hoseason, first mate on the Sprightly, an Enderby Brothers sealing ship which operated in these waters in 1824–25.

See also 
 Angot Point
 List of Antarctic and sub-Antarctic islands

References

Islands of the Palmer Archipelago